This page covers all relevant details regarding SC Juventus București for all official competitions inside the 2017–18 season.

Players

First team squad

Out on loan

Transfers

Summer

In:

Out:

Winter

In:

Out:

Statistics

Goalscorers
Last updated on 2 June 2018 (UTC)

Pre-season and friendlies

Competitions

Liga I

Regular season

Table

Position by round

Results

Relegation round

Table

Position by round

Results

Cupa României

Results

See also

 2017–18 Cupa României
 2017–18 Liga I

Notes and references

ASC Daco-Getica București seasons
Juventus